Crazy Moon may refer to:

 Crazy Moon (film), a 1987 film
 Crazy Moon (album), a 1978 by Crazy Horse